Marcel David (6 April 1895 – 19 December 1979) was a French politician.

David was the son of an educator, born on 6 April 1895 in Le Meix-Saint-Epoing. After completing his studies in philosophy, David began working for a school in Mont-de-Marsan in 1940. That same year, he joined the French Resistance. In 1941, David became a member of a resistance group named Libération-Nord. After World War II had ended, David served as mayor of Mont-de-Marsan from 1945 to 1947, and thereafter was a member of the municipal council. He took office as a general councilor representing the canton of Mont-de-Marsan in September 1945, and was elected to the First and Second Constituent Assembly as a representative of the French Section of the Workers' International. David subsequently served on the first through third convocations of the National Assembly from 1946 to 1958. He died in Mont-de-Marsan on 19 December 1979.

References

1895 births
1979 deaths
French general councillors
Mayors of places in Nouvelle-Aquitaine
French Resistance members
Members of the Constituent Assembly of France (1945)
Deputies of the 1st National Assembly of the French Fourth Republic
Deputies of the 2nd National Assembly of the French Fourth Republic
Deputies of the 3rd National Assembly of the French Fourth Republic
French Section of the Workers' International politicians